Ludger Lohmann  (born 1954 in Herne) is a highly acknowledged organist, winner of several international organ competitions, namely the ARD International Music Competition (Association of German Broadcasting Corporations) in Munich 1979 and Grand Prix de Chartres in 1982. He performed in concert tours throughout Europe, Northern and Southern America, Japan or Korea.

Since 1983 he is Professor of Organ at Staatliche Hochschule für Musik und Darstellende Kunst and organist at St. Eberhard Catholic Cathedral, Stuttgart.

Since 1989 he is a guest professor at Hartt School of Music, University of Hartford, Conn., USA senior researcher in the Göteborg Organ Art Center at the University of Göteborg, Sweden. He is also jury member of many international competitions and teacher in international master classes.

References

Sources
 

German classical organists
German male organists
Cathedral organists
German music educators
People from Herne, North Rhine-Westphalia
1954 births
Living people
University of Hartford Hartt School faculty
21st-century organists
21st-century German male musicians
Male classical organists